Mount Obiglio is a moderate rock summit (510 m) in the west-central portion of Grant Island, along the edge of the Getz Ice Shelf, coastal Marie Byrd Land. It consists of a volcanic cone that was formed by Strombolian and phreatomagmatic eruptions 0.51 million years ago.

Discovered and charted from the USS 1961–62. Named by Advisory Committee on Antarctic Names (US-ACAN) for Lieutenant G.M. Obiglio, Argentine naval observer aboard Glacier, at the suggestion of the Task Unit Commander, Captain Edwin A. McDonald, USN.

References

Mountains of Marie Byrd Land
Volcanoes of Marie Byrd Land
Pleistocene volcanoes
Volcanic cones